WYMW is a radio station licensed to Hurricane, West Virginia, serving Hurricane and Putnam County, West Virginia. WYMW is owned and operated by Positive Alternative Radio, Inc.

History
Until April 5, 2012, WYMW was owned by Baker Family Stations and carried an Oldies/Classic rock format.

References

External links

YMW
Radio stations established in 1966
YMW
1966 establishments in West Virginia